Eskilstuna BS is a bandy club in Eskilstuna, Sweden, established in 1965 following a merger of the bandy sections of Eskilhems BK and VoIF Diana. The men's bandy team played in the Swedish top division in the seasons of 1972-1973 and 1977-1978.

References

External links
Official website 

1965 establishments in Sweden
Bandy clubs in Sweden
Bandy clubs established in 1965
Sport in Eskilstuna